Don Wilson Basham (September 17, 1926 – March 27, 1989) was a Bible teacher and author. Born and raised in Wichita Falls, Texas, Basham was raised in a Baptist home but later joined the Christian Church (Disciples of Christ) whilst at college. He became involved in the Charismatic renewal in 1963.
Basham studied at Midwestern State University, Phillips University (BA) and its graduate seminary in Enid, Oklahoma (BD).

Following the reported miraculous healing of a close friend, Basham and his wife Alice experienced a spiritual awakening that led him to leave a career in commercial art in 1951 to enter the Christian ministry. He was ordained as a Disciples of Christ Minister in 1955.

Family
Whilst at college, he met Alice Roling who was also born and raised in Wichita Falls. They married in 1949 and had five children; Cindi, Shari, Glenn, Lisa and Laura. Cindi, one of his daughters, married Dick Leggatt who later became the President of Derek Prince Ministries.

Pastorates
After a five-year pastorate in suburban Washington D.C., he became pastor of the Hillcrest Christian Church in Toronto, Ontario, Canada and later pastored East Side church in Sharon, Pennsylvania.

Itinerant Ministry
After the publication of his first book, Basham left the pastorate in 1967 to commence a freelance writing and travelling ministry.

He travelled extensively in the US and abroad (Jamaica, England, Ireland, Germany, Italy, Austria, Yugoslavia, Hungary, Israel and New Zealand)  teaching on subjects such as the Holy Spirit, deliverance, spiritual authority and faith.

Basham's deliverance ministry resulted in some notoriety. In the 1970s, Basham's and Prince's teaching on deliverance and practice of public exorcisms had a significant impact on the charismatic movement.

Christian Growth Ministries
In 1970, Basham, along with Bible teachers Derek Prince, Bob Mumford, Ern Baxter and Charles Simpson, began teaching a controversial doctrine of 'spiritual covering' that required individual Christians to be submitted and accountable to a leader. They became the leaders of the Shepherding Movement. Basham submitted himself to Derek Prince as his personal shepherd.

Together with Prince and Mumford, Basham established Good News Church in Fort Lauderdale, Florida in 1974. Basham later relocated with the CGM to Mobile, Alabama in 1982 when it adopted the name Integrity Communications.

Basham was the editor of CGMs monthly magazine, New Wine from 1975 to 1981 and served as chief editorial consultant until it ceased publication in 1986. New Wine at one time was the most widely circulated Charismatic publication in the US.

Books
Basham wrote sixteen books and numerous articles for Christian magazines.

 A Handbook on Holy Spirit Baptism
 A handbook on tongues, interpretation and prophecy
 A manual for spiritual warfare
 Beyond Blessing to Obedience, CGM Publishing (1976)
 Can a Christian have a demon?
 Deliver us from Evil
 Deliver us from Temptation
 Face up with a miracle
 Lead Us Not into Temptation, Chosen Books (1986)
 How God guides us
 Spiritual Power: How to Get it, How to Give it
 True and False Prophets, Manna Books (1973)
 Miracle of Tongues
 The Most Dangerous Game
 The way I see it
 Willing to Forgive

Co-author of:

 Family, Integrity Publications, (1982)
 The unseen war, New Wine Publications (undated)
 Seed Truth, Manna Christian Outreach (1975)

References

Related links
 New Wine Magazine archives
 Bob Mumford, Lifechangers
 Charles Simpson Ministries
 Derek Prince Ministries, International
 Good News Church

20th-century Protestants
American Charismatics
Christian Church (Disciples of Christ) clergy
American Disciples of Christ
Phillips University alumni
1926 births
1989 deaths
American exorcists